Dubas may refer to:

 Dubas, Marcinkonys, a village in Varėna District Municipality, Lithuania
 British Dubas (1936–late 1950s), Kenyan police maintained by the British colonial government; see

People with the surname
 Annette Dubas (born 1956), American politician
 Jonathan Dubas (born 1991), Swiss basketball player
 Kyle Dubas (born 1985), Canadian ice hockey executive
 Marie Dubas (1894–1972), French singer

See also
 
 Dupas (disambiguation)